The House Across the Lake is a 2022 thriller novel by American author Todd Ritter, writing under the penname Riley Sager.

Synopsis
Per the official book synopsis, the story is about:

Release
The House Across the Lake was first published in the United States on June 21, 2022 through Dutton in hardback and ebook formats. An audiobook adaptation narrated by Bernadette Dunne was released simultaneously through Penguin Audio.

The book placed on the Publishers Weekly bestseller list for the week of July 10, 2022.

Reception
Reviews for the book commented on the novel's twists, with some reviewers praising them while others did not. USA Today and BookPage were both favorable in their reviews, with both comparing the storyline to Alfred Hitchcock's Rear Window. The St. Louis Post Dispatch and Daily Herald were both more critical, as the Daily Herald felt that "As with Sager's first five thrillers, the characters are well-drawn and the prose is first-rate. However, the book takes readers on such a wild ride that some may find it too improbable to swallow."

References

American thriller novels
2022 American novels
Novels by Riley Sager
E. P. Dutton books